Love County is a county on the southern border of the U.S. state of Oklahoma. As of the 2010 census, the population was 9,423. Its county seat is Marietta. The county was created at statehood in 1907 and named for Overton Love, a prominent Chickasaw farmer, entrepreneur and politician.

For tourism purposes, the Oklahoma Department of Tourism includes Love County in 'Chickasaw Country'. Love County is also part of the Texoma region.

History
The Louisiana Purchase, effected in 1803, included all of the present state of Oklahoma except the Panhandle. Explorers and traders began travelling extensively through the area, intending to find trade routes to Santa Fe. The Quapaw were the principal Native Americans living south of the Canadian River. The Quapaws ceded their land to the American government in 1818, and were replaced by the Choctaws in the early 1830s. The Chickasaws were assigned land in the middle of Choctaw territory during 1837–8.

Overton Love was one of the earliest Chickasaws who settled in present-day Love County. He was twenty years old when he arrived in Indian Territory from Mississippi in 1843. He later became one of the largest Chickasaw landowners and cattle raisers in the area, working  of Red River Bottomland. Eventually, he became a member of both houses of the Chickasaw National Council, a county and district judge, and a member of the Dawes Commission.

Prior to statehood, the area now known as Love County was part of Pickens County, Chickasaw Nation, Indian Territory. It had three incorporated towns: Marietta (the county seat, founded in 1887), Leon (established 1883) and Thackerville (established 1882).  It also contained two unincorporated postal areas: Burneyville (post office established 1879) and Overbrook (post office established 1887).  The settlement of Courtney at the mouth of Mud Creek was settled ca. 1872 by Henry D. Courtney.

Geography

It is the fifth-smallest county in Oklahoma by land area.

Love County is within the Red River Plains physiographic region, with a rolling to hilly topography. The Red River and its tributaries Simon Creek, Walnut Bayou, Hickory Creek and Mud Creek drain the county. Lake Murray is on the northeastern border and Lake Texoma is on the southern border.

Adjacent counties
 Carter County (north)
 Marshall County (east)
 Cooke County, Texas (south)
 Montague County, Texas (southwest)
 Jefferson County (northwest)

Demographics

As of the census of 2000, there were 8,831 people, 3,442 households, and 2,557 families residing in the county. The population density was 17 people per square mile (7/km2). There were 4,066 housing units at an average density of 8 per square mile (3/km2).  The racial makeup of the county was 84.15% White, 2.19% Black or African American, 6.41% Native American, 0.26% Asian, 0.01% Pacific Islander, 3.58% from other races, and 3.41% from two or more races. 7.01% of the population were Hispanic or Latino of any race.

There were 3,442 households, out of which 31.70% had children under the age of 18 living with them, 60.40% were married couples living together, 10.00% had a female householder with no husband present, and 25.70% were non-families. 22.90% of all households were made up of individuals, and 12.00% had someone living alone who was 65 years of age or older. The average household size was 2.54 and the average family size was 2.97.

In the county, the population was spread out, with 25.70% under the age of 18, 7.00% from 18 to 24, 25.40% from 25 to 44, 25.70% from 45 to 64, and 16.20% who were 65 years of age or older. The median age was 39 years. For every 100 females, there were 98.20 males.  For every 100 females age 18 and over, there were 94.90 males.

The county's median household income was $32,558, and the median family income was $38,212. Males had a median income of $30,024 versus $20,578 for females. The county's per capita income was $16,648. About 8.80% of families and 11.80% of the population were below the poverty line, including 14.40% of those under age 18 and 13.80% of those age 65 or over.

Politics

Economy
Love County is home to Winstar World Casino, across the Red River from the Texas-Oklahoma border.  The casino is operated by the Chickasaw Nation, and is the county's largest private employer. Agriculture and ranching have been important to the county economy since its inception. Leading non-agricultural employers include the Marietta Bakery, Murray Biscuit Company, Marietta Sportswear, Robertson Hams, Rapistan Systems, Earth Energy Systems, and the Joe Brown Company. The county also produces natural gas and its co-products propane and butanes.

Education
The following school districts are in Love County:
 Turner Public Schools
 Marietta Public Schools
 Thackerville Public Schools
 Greenville Public Schools

Transportation

Major highways
  Interstate 35
  U.S. Highway 77
  State Highway 32
  State Highway 76
  State Highway 77S
  State Highway 89
  State Highway 96

Airports
Public-use airports in Love County:
 Falconhead Airport (37K) in Burneyville
 McGehee Catfish Restaurant Airport (T40) in Marietta (closed)
 McGehee Catfish Restaurant Airport (4O2) in Marietta (closed)

Communities

City
 Marietta (county seat)

Towns
 Leon
 Thackerville

Unincorporated communities
 Courtney
 Enville
 Hoxbar
 Jimtown
 Orr
 Overbrook
 Rubottom

Other Population Divisions

Census-designated places
 Burneyville
 Greenville

School Districts

Political Precincts

Zip Codes

Area Code(s)

See also
 National Register of Historic Places listings in Love County, Oklahoma

References

External links
 Pictures of Marietta
 Oklahoma Digital Maps: Digital Collections of Oklahoma and Indian Territory

 
Ardmore, Oklahoma micropolitan area
1907 establishments in Oklahoma
Populated places established in 1907